Foung Hawj (RPA: Foom Hawj;) is an American media producer and politician who is a member of the Minnesota Senate. A member of the Minnesota Democratic–Farmer–Labor Party (DFL), he represents District 67, which includes the east side of Saint Paul in Ramsey County.

Early life, education, and career
Foung was born in Laos. His father was a military diplomat overseeing air deliveries of humanitarian cargo in Vientiane and Long Tieng. His mother, a country girl without education, learned to operate a pharmacy in Ban Xon City. Foung grew up during the Vietnam War and lived in refugee camps with his family before coming to the United States. In 1990, he received his B.A. in Media Arts and Computer Science from the University of Kansas and earned his M.S. in Applied Science and Technology from New York's Rochester Institute of Technology in 2001.

Foung was a series producer for Twin Cities Public Television in the 1990s before starting his own multimedia business in 1996, Digital Motion LLC. He co-founded the Hmong-American DFL Caucus in 1992 and other community organizations including Center for the Hmong Arts and Talent, the Minnesota Hmong Chamber of Commerce and Gateway Food Initiative Co-op which launched the development of the Mississippi Market on East 7th Street.

Minnesota Senate
Foung was one of nine DFL candidates running for the Senate seat in 2010, losing in the primary to St. Paul police chief John Harrington. He ran again in 2012, supported by the Sierra Club and a broad coalition that included the Hmong-American community, but also Latino, Somali, and African American voters. He won the primary, and went on to win the general election on November 6, 2012. His legislative concerns include economic development,  social and economic equity, education, housing, environment, and healthcare.  Some of his first term accomplishments for District 67 include new business developments on 7th Street, the Science and Education Center for Metro State University, and job creation dollars to boost the local economy.

He kicked off his re-election campaign on January 16, 2016 at the Carpenter Union in his district. Hawj was re-elected in both 2016 and 2020, and currently serves on the Jobs and Economic Growth Finance and Policy and Veterans and Military Affairs Finance and Policy Committees. Hawj is also the ranking minority member on the Environment and Natural Resources Policy and Legacy Finance Committee.

Personal life
Foung is an outdoorsman and has worked as a videographer and scriptwriter, producing Hmong environmental videos. He lives at the south end of Lake Phalen and is captain of a dragon boat team. He spells his last name Hawj in RPA so that English-speakers can better approximate its pronunciation.

References

External links

Senator Foung Hawj official Minnesota Senate website
Senator Foung Hawj official campaign website
Digital Motion LLC
Foung Heu at WorldCat

Living people
Politicians from Saint Paul, Minnesota
American politicians of Hmong descent
Asian-American people in Minnesota politics
Democratic Party Minnesota state senators
University of Kansas alumni
Rochester Institute of Technology alumni
21st-century American politicians
Candidates in the 2010 United States elections
Laotian emigrants to the United States
Hmong activists
Multimedia
Candidates in the 2012 United States elections
Refugees in the United States
Year of birth missing (living people)
Television producers from Minnesota